Drug delivery refers to approaches, formulations, manufacturing techniques, storage systems, and technologies involved in transporting a pharmaceutical compound to its target site to achieve a desired therapeutic effect. Principles related to drug preparation, route of administration, site-specific targeting, metabolism, and toxicity are used to optimize efficacy and safety, and to improve patient convenience and compliance. Drug delivery is aimed at altering a drug's pharmacokinetics and specificity by formulating it with different excipients, drug carriers, and medical devices. There is additional emphasis on increasing the bioavailability and duration of action of a drug to improve therapeutic outcomes. Some research has also been focused on improving safety for the person administering the medication. For example, several types of microneedle patches have been developed for administering vaccines and other medications to reduce the risk of needlestick injury.

Drug delivery is a concept heavily integrated with dosage form and route of administration, the latter sometimes being considered part of the definition. While route of administration is often used interchangeably with drug delivery, the two are separate concepts. Route of administration refers to the path a drug takes to enter the body, whereas drug delivery also encompasses the engineering of delivery systems and can include different dosage forms and devices used to deliver a drug through the same route. Common routes of administration include oral, parenteral (injected), sublingual, topical, transdermal, nasal, ocular, rectal, and vaginal, however, drug delivery is not limited to these routes and there may be several ways to deliver medications through other routes.

Since the approval of the first controlled-release formulation in the 1950s, research into new delivery systems has been progressing, as opposed to new drug development which has been declining. Several factors may be contributing to this shift in focus. One of the driving factors is the high cost of developing new drugs. A 2013 review found the cost of developing a delivery system was only 10% of the cost of developing a new pharmaceutical. A more recent study found the median cost of bringing a new drug to market was $985 million in 2020, but did not look at the cost of developing drug delivery systems. Other factors that have potentially influenced the increase in drug delivery system development may include the increasing prevalence of both chronic and infectious diseases, as well as a general increased understanding of the pharmacology, pharmacokinetics, and pharmacodynamics of many drugs.

Current efforts 
Current efforts in drug delivery are vast and include topics such as controlled-release formulations, targeted delivery, nanomedicine, drug carriers, 3D printing, and the delivery of biologic drugs.

The relation between nanomaterial and drug delivery 
Nanotechnology is a broad field of research and development that deals with the manipulation of matter at the atomic or subatomic level. It is used in fields such as medicine, energy, aerospace engineering, and more. One of the applications of nanotechnology in drug delivery. This is a process by which nanoparticles are used to carry and deliver drugs to a specific area in the body. There are several advantages of using nanotechnology for drug delivery, including precise targeting of specific cells, increased drug potency, and lowered toxicity to the cells that are targeted. Nanoparticles can also carry vaccines to cells that might be hard to reach with traditional delivery methods. However, there are some concerns with the use of nanoparticles for drug delivery. Some studies have shown that nanoparticles may contribute to the development of tumors in other parts of the body. There is also growing concern that nanoparticles may have harmful effects on the environment. Despite these potential drawbacks, the use of nanotechnology in drug delivery is still a promising area for future research.

Targeted delivery 
Targeted drug delivery is the delivery of a drug to its target site without having an effect on other tissues. Interest in targeted drug delivery has grown drastically due to its potential implications in the treatment of cancers and other chronic diseases. In order to achieve efficient targeted delivery, the designed system must avoid the host's defense mechanisms and circulate to its intended site of action. A number of drug carriers have been studied to effectively target specific tissues, including liposomes, nanogels, and other nanotechnologies.

Controlled-release formulations 
Controlled or modified-release formulations alter the rate and timing at which a drug is liberated, in order to produce adequate or sustained drug concentrations. The first controlled-release (CR) formulation that was developed was Dexedrine in the 1950s. This period of time saw more drugs being formulated as CR, as well as the introduction of transdermal patches to allow drugs to slowly absorb through the skin. Since then, countless other CR products have been developed to account for the physiochemical properties of different drugs, such as depot injections for antipsychotics and sex hormones that require dosing once every few months.

Since the late 1990s, most of the research around CR formulations has been focused on implementing nanoparticles to decrease the rate of drug clearance.

Modulated drug release and zero-order drug release 
Many scientists worked to create oral formulations that could maintain a constant drug level because of the ability of drug release at a zero-order rate.blood's concentration. However, a few physiological restrictions made it challenging to create such oral formulations. First, because the lower parts of the intestine have a decreased capacity for absorption, the medication absorption typically declines as an oral formulation moves from the stomach to the intestine. The decreased drug amount released from the formulation over time frequently made this condition worse. Phenylpropanolamine HCl release from was the only instance of sustaining consistent blood concentration for roughly 16 hours.

Delivery of biologic drugs 
Pharmaceutical preparations containing peptides, proteins, antibodies, genes, or other biologic components often face absorption issues due to their large sizes or electrostatic charges, and may be susceptible to enzymatic degradation once they have entered the body. For these reasons, recent efforts in drug delivery have been focused on methods to avoid these issues through the use of liposomes, nanoparticles, fusion proteins, protein-cage nanoparticles, exploiting routes for the delivery of biologicals that toxins use and many others. Intracellular delivery of macromolecules by chemical carriers is most advanced for RNA, as known from RNA-based COVID-19 vaccines, while proteins have also been delivered into cells in vivo and DNA is routinely delivered in vitro.

One of the applications of drug delivery system by using nanoparticles 
Drug delivery systems have been around for many years, but there are a few recent applications of drug delivery that warrant
1. Drug delivery to the brain: Many drugs can be harmful when administered systemically; the brain is very sensitive to medications and can easily cause damage if a drug is administered directly into the bloodstream. As new drug formulations are being developed for brain diseases, including Alzheimer’s disease and Parkinson’s disease, researchers are working on ways to deliver drugs into the brain that do not cause damage to healthy tissue. For example, scientists have developed nanoparticles that can cross the protective blood-brain barrier and deliver drugs directly to the brain.

See also 

Acoustic targeted drug delivery
Asymmetric membrane capsule
Bioavailability
Bovine submaxillary mucin coatings
Chemotactic drug-targeting
Drug delivery to the brain
Drug carrier
Magnetic drug delivery
Neural drug delivery systems
Retrometabolic drug design
Self-microemulsifying drug delivery system
Tecrea
Thin film drug delivery

References

External links 
Article in Chemical and Engineering News

Medical equipment